KDDF is a class A radio station broadcasting out of Mecca, California.

History
On May 19, 2015, KDDF went on the air as KHXR, switching to its current callsign a month later on June 19, 2015.

The station was sold by original owner and builder Holy Cross Radio to El Sembrador Ministries in 2016.

References

External links

Mass media in Riverside County, California
2015 establishments in California
Radio stations established in 2015
DDF